Anna L Gloyn is an endocrinologist and geneticist, who is Professor of Pediatrics (Endocrinology) and Genetics at the Stanford University. She was the recipient of the Minkowski Prize in 2014 for her research into causal mechanisms of diabetes pathogenesis. Her work has contributed to improved treatment options for people with rare forms of diabetes and helped advance our understanding of type 2 diabetes.

Education 
Gloyn studied for a BSc in Medical Biochemistry at the University of Surrey. This was followed by a DPhil on the Molecular Genetics of Type 2 Diabetes at Green College at the University of Oxford, supervised by Professor Robert Turner. She worked at the University of Exeter for her post-doctoral training, supervised by Professors Andrew Hattersley & Sian Ellard, as well as Professor Franz M. Matschinsky at the University of Pennsylvania.

Career 
In 2004 Gloyn returned to the University of Oxford funded by a Diabetes UK RD Lawrence Career Development Fellowship to establish a research group to examine "beta-cell function through the investigation of genetic variants causally implicated in monogenic diabetes". In 2011 she was awarded a Wellcome Senior Fellowship in Basic Biomedical Science to continue her research. This was renewed in 2016. Her research has focused on how human genetic variants can be used as tools to examine how insulin secretion and action are regulated. In 2014 she was awarded the Minkowski Prize. The same year she was promoted to Professor of Molecular Genetics & Metabolism.

In 2020 Gloyn was appointed Professor of Pediatrics (Endocrinology) and, by courtesy, of Genetics, at the University of Stanford. This appointment enabled the movement of her research group to Stanford where it now runs as the Translational Genomics of Diabetes Lab.

Gloyn is a founding member of the International Common Disease Alliance (ICDA). She is also a member of the executive committee of the Atlas of Variant Effects Alliance.

Awards 

 European Association for the Study of Diabetes (EASD) Rising Star Award (2005)
 Diabetes UK RD Lawrence Named Lecture (2009)
 GB Morgagni Silver Medal (2014)
 EASD Minkowski Prize (2014)
 Diabetes UK Dorothy Hodgkin Lecture (2019)
 American Diabetes Association Outstanding Scientific Achievement Award (2022)

References 

Women endocrinologists
Endocrinologists
Alumni of the University of Oxford
Stanford University faculty
Alumni of the University of Surrey
Minkowski Prize recipients
Living people
Year of birth missing (living people)